Rainbow Creek is a stream entirely within Washington County, Ohio.

Rainbow Creek, noted for its rainbow shape, lent its name to the community of Rainbow, Ohio.

See also
List of rivers of Ohio

References

Rivers of Washington County, Ohio
Rivers of Ohio